Harry Snyder (September 9, 1913 – December 14, 1976) was a Canadian-born businessman. He founded In-N-Out Burger along with his wife Esther Snyder. Snyder was one of the first people to develop the idea of a drive-through hamburger restaurant, where customers could order their food via an intercom.

His wife and he opened the first IN-N-OUT Burger on October 22, 1948, in the Los Angeles suburb of Baldwin Park, California. In-N-Out is described as California's first drive-through. By the mid-1950s, the chain had expanded to six stores in the Los Angeles area. By the time of Snyder's death in 1976 from lung cancer, the company had expanded to 18 stores.

References

External links

Further reading 

1913 births
1976 deaths
American food company founders
Businesspeople from Los Angeles
Businesspeople from Vancouver
Canadian emigrants to the United States
Deaths from lung cancer in California
Fast-food chain founders
People from Baldwin Park, California
20th-century American businesspeople
Snyder family